John Coney may refer to:

John Coney (silversmith) (1655–1722), American silversmith
John Coney (engraver) (1786–1833), British artist
John Coney Moulton (1886–1926), British zoologist